Liam Darren Shaw (born 12 March 2001) is an English professional footballer who plays as a defensive midfielder for League One club Morecambe on loan from Celtic.

Career

Sheffield Wednesday
Liam Shaw was born in Sheffield joined Sheffield Wednesday at the age of eight and worked his way up through the club. He would sign his first professional contract on the 21 December 2018, signing a contract until the summer of 2021.

He went out on loan on the 21 November 2019 to National League side Chesterfield for one month, where he would play 5 games in total for The Spireites.

Later that season, he would make his professional debut for Sheffield Wednesday against Queens Park Rangers on the 11 July 2020. and play one other game against Middlesbrough on the final game of the 2019–20 season. During the 2020–21 season, he would become more of a first team regular which would see him score his first professional goal against Middlesbrough on the 29 December 2020, as well as being shown a straight red card against Reading on the 3 December 2020. His form would see him linked with a move to Scottish Premiership side Celtic. In February 2021 it was reported that Shaw had signed a pre-contract agreement with Celtic, with a £300,000 compensation fee mooted. But he would remain with the Sheffield Wednesday first team, and a few days later would be sent off for the second time that season against Birmingham City.

Celtic
On 10 March 2021, Sheffield Wednesday confirmed that Shaw had signed a pre-contract agreement with Scottish Premiership side Celtic, but would "remain a Sheffield Wednesday player until the expiry of his current contract and will be available for selection for the remainder of the season". It was officially confirmed by Celtic on 15 June 2021, where they announced he had signed a four-year contract with the club. He made his debut for Celtic in a UEFA Europa League tie against Real Betis on 9 December 2021.

After making only one further appearance for Celtic in the first part of the 2021–22 season, Shaw was loaned to Motherwell in January 2022.

Career statistics

Honours
Celtic
Scottish League Cup: 2021–22

References

2001 births
Living people
Footballers from Sheffield
English footballers
Association football defenders
Association football midfielders
English Football League players
Scottish Professional Football League players
Sheffield Wednesday F.C. players
Chesterfield F.C. players
Celtic F.C. players
Motherwell F.C. players
Morecambe F.C. players